Stanford Everyday People, popularly known as EP, is Stanford University's only Hip-Hop, R&B, Motown and Soul a cappella group.   The group is known for its tight, soulful sound and wearing all black. It was founded in 1987 and has released ten studio albums to date.  EP has toured the United States, Jamaica and the Bahamas.

History 

Founded in 1987 by Stanford University juniors Larry Shorter and Tony Stovall, the group's name is a tribute to Sly and the Family Stone's vision of inclusiveness and acceptance of all races, genders, and creeds as well as their 1967 hit of the same title.

In 2017, EP performed with artists Wiz Khalifa and Ouyang Nana at the Breakthrough Prize awards ceremony.

In addition to performing at campus and Bay Area events, EP has toured the United States, Jamaica and the Bahamas.

EP is an entirely student-run organization: the arrangements in its repertoire have all been arranged and transcribed by its own members, past and present. While EP generally performs with a group of 8-16 singers, graduating members always remain a part of the group.

Discography 

Dress Black (1989)
Shades of Soul (1993)
Wail (1996)
2648 West Grand Blvd. (1998)
EP Jones (1999)
Extended Play (2001)
Lovespeak (2004)
The Next Episode (2009)
The Sweetest (2014)
Evolution (2018) - EP

Awards and nominations 

|-
| 1994
| Contemporary A Cappella Recording Awards
| Best Mixed Collegiate Soloist
| Sean White
| style="background: #F4F2B0" | 
| 
|-
| rowspan="2" | 1997
| rowspan="2" | Contemporary A Cappella Recording Awards
| rowspan="2" | Best Mixed Collegiate Soloist
| Osi Imeokparia
| style="background: #F4F2B0" | 
| 
|-
| Crystal McCreary
| 
| 
|-
| rowspan="3" | 1999
| rowspan="3" | Contemporary A Cappella Recording Awards
| Best Mixed Collegiate Album
| 2648 West Grand Blvd
| style="background: #F4F2B0" | 
| rowspan="3" | 
|-
| Best Mixed Collegiate Song
| "You're All I Need to Get By"
| style="background: #F4F2B0" | 
|-
| Best Mixed Collegiate Soloist
| Crystal McCreary
| style="background: #F4F2B0" | 
|-
| rowspan="4" | 2000
| rowspan="4" | Contemporary A Cappella Recording Awards
| Best Mixed Collegiate Album
| EP Jones
| 
| rowspan="2" | 
|-
| Best Mixed Collegiate Song
| "The House That Jack Built"
| style="background: #F4F2B0" | 
|-
| Best Mixed Collegiate Arrangement
| Kevin Kumar
| 
| rowspan="2" | 
|-
| Best Mixed Collegiate Soloist
| Mariama White-Hammond
| 
|-
| rowspan="3' | 2002
| rowspan="3" | Contemporary A Cappella Recording Awards
| Best Mixed Collegiate Album
| Extended Play
| style="background: #F4F2B0" | 
| 
|-
| Best Mixed Collegiate Song
| "Spend My Life With You"
| 
| rowspan="2" | 
|-
| Best Mixed Collegiate Soloist
| Nathan Reed for "I Do"
| 
|-
| rowspan="2" | 2005
| rowspan="2" | Contemporary A Cappella Recording Awards
| Best Mixed Collegiate Album
| Lovespeak
| style="background: #F4F2B0" | 
| rowspan="2" | 
|-
| Best Mixed Collegiate Solo
| Cindy Lou for "Save Your Love For Me"
|

ICCA results 

The International Championship of Collegiate A Cappella (ICCA) first judged live a cappella performance competitions in 1996.

Notable alumni 

Notable alumni include:
 Actor Barney Cheng
 Award-winning singer-songwriter Jamie Green
 Singer-songwriters and producers Kevin and Sean Kumar
 Broadway actress Katie Nutt
 Jazz vocalist Katie Nutt
 Prince Fahad Al-Saud of Saudi Arabia.

See also 
 List of Stanford University a cappella groups

References

External links 
Everyday People's Website
Everyday People's YouTube Page

Collegiate a cappella groups
Musical groups established in 2002
Everyday People
2002 establishments in California